Bacolod, officially the Municipality of Bacolod (Maranao: Inged a Bacolod;), is a 4th class municipality in the province of Lanao del Norte, Philippines. According to the 2020 census, it has a population of 24,367 people. The town is home to an old Spanish fort, known as Fuerza de Bacolod, which is in dire need of proper conservation and faithful restoration by the National Museum of the Philippines.

Etymology
Bacolod in the Maranao language means "wide shore". When Maranaos and other people pass the area as they journey by sea, they will always see the shore along present-day Bacolod very wide during low tide, hence, they call the area "bacolod". It was once a mere barrio of the municipality of Kolambugan, the oldest town of the province of Lanao del Norte. This island is located at a point of an existing barangay called Binuni.

History
Before the Spanish colonization of the Philippine archipelago began, the majority people living in Bacolod were the Maranao tribe.
In folk story from the old leaders said, during Spain occupation, some of the leaders from the interior areas of lanao del norte they usually cross the beach of municipality of kolambogan to beach of Ozamis City by boat to catch people living in other side and make them as worker (personal helper) or other said BISAYA in maranaw term. There was also a story that Mutia Family in Zamboanga del Norte and Misamis Occidental is originally came from Interior area in Lanao del Norte and even now still existing the story because of the great-great-great-grandfather of their great-great-grandfather of Mutia Families in Zamboanga del Norte and Misamis Occidental lifted a small one piece of book hanging in the center of the house and said to the children the forbidden and do not even touch of even open the book, and according to the claimed soon for many years when somebody open they saw writing but not familiar (Spanish language, English language), and some say that near to Arabic letters.

In long living and social process and sometimes in 1935 – 1944, under the National Land Settlement Administration (NLSA) of the Commonwealth Government, there was a Philippine House of Representative proposal to invade the Island of Mindanao to use the some land to help the Philippine Government, and one of the opposition that time is Congressman Datu Salipada Khalid Pendatun. The proposal was approved and signed by President Manuel L. Quezon, he is the president that time. The settlers are compose of people have knowledge about skill job, Agri Technician, Engineers, Farming.

The settlers are compose of different people from the Islands of Visayas and Island Luzon that has knowledge and experience of Agriculture, Technical, Farming, Lumber, Carpenter etc. The first batch transport were landed to the following Areas:

In Lanao del Norte, the transport of settlers was peacefully successful due to the smooth negotiations with the Maranao Tribal Leaders and Land Lords. As Welcome sign, the Land lords has donate piece of land (piece of land before are more than 5 hectares) to start the settlers life as beginning of life. In long run and process, the family of settler works to the land owners and as a gift since they are very good workers, the land lord gave the small piece of land as a gift. Some say that, settlers trade they made the business to the land lord just few item exchange of lands. Some family of land lords marry the daughter of their workers which result and until the majority living in Lanao del Norte and Misamis Occidental has blood in Maranao Tribe (Muslim Blood).

On the hand, the settlement has going problem and conflict between Non-Muslim and Muslim when Martial Law is implemented.

Geography

Barangays
Bacolod is politically subdivided into 16 barangays.

Climate

Demographics

Economy

References

External links
   Bacolod Profile at the DTI Cities and Municipalities Competitive Index
 [ Philippine Standard Geographic Code]
Philippine Census Information
Local Governance Performance Management System

1956 establishments in the Philippines
Municipalities of Lanao del Norte